The discography of the Claw Boys Claw, a rock and roll band from the Netherlands active since 1984, comprises a dozen albums and more than a dozen singles. After two independent releases, the band signed with Polydor. After three albums for EMI in the early nineties and one more in 1997, the band went into semi-retirement, from which it emerged in 2008, now under contract with Play It Again Sam (PIAS). As a result of the band's renewed activity, PIAS reissued the band's debut album, and EMI reissued a number of albums from the 1990s.

Albums

Compilation albums

Singles

References

Claw Boys Claw Discography
Claw Boys Claw Discography at Muziek Centrum Nederland

 
Discographies of Dutch artists